Zachary Michael Thomas (born September 1, 1973) is an American former professional football player who was a middle linebacker in the National Football League (NFL) for 13 seasons.  He played college football for Texas Tech University, and was recognized as a unanimous All-American.  He was drafted in the fifth round, 22nd pick (154th overall), in the 1996 NFL Draft by the Miami Dolphins, and played for the Dolphins in his first 12 seasons in the NFL, before playing his 13th and final season with the Dallas Cowboys.

While despite his small undersized stature, limited speed, and lack of athletic ability (according to pro scouts), Zach Thomas made up with his habitual excessive study habits, always being well prepared, uncanny intelligence, versatility, and instincts as a linebacker, and his prone leadership. In his rookie year in 1996, Thomas was voted the Dolphins Team Newcomer of the Year, and also won his first of two Dolphins Team MVP awards (1996, 2001). He was also named the AFC  Defensive Rookie of the Year in 1996. Thomas was also the first Dolphins player to win the Dolphins Team Leadership Award (voted by his teammates) a record three times (1998-1999, 2005), until Jason Taylor surpassed him with four (2002, 2006-2007, 2009). 

From 1998-2006, Thomas led a defensive unit that finished top 10 in total defense in seven consecutive seasons (1998-2004), and in eight out of nine (2006). In five of those nine seasons (1998, 2000, 2002-2003, 2006), Thomas' defenses finished top five in total scoring defense, including 1st overall in 1998. 

Thomas is also known for his longevity with the Dolphins, and currently is 2nd all time in Dolphins history for most games played by a defensive player in the team's history with 168, behind Taylor's 204. A seven-time Pro Bowl selection (the most ever by a Dolphins defensive player), and seven-time first (5) or second (2) team All-Pro, Thomas recorded more than 1,700 combined tackles in his career which included leading the league in tackles twice (2002, 2006), was named a two-time NFL Alumni Linebacker of the Year (1998, 2006), and was selected to the NFL 2000s All-Decade Team. 

In 2015, Thomas was inducted into the College Football Hall of Fame. On February 9th, 2023 in his 10th year of eligibility and in his 4th straight year being a finalist, Zach Thomas was elected as a member to the Pro Football Hall of Fame Class of 2023, and is set to be formally enshrined on August 5th.

Early years
Thomas was born in Pampa, Texas.  He attended White Deer Schools in White Deer, Texas until he was a sophomore then transferred to Pampa High School in his junior year.  He was a standout high school football player and was named a first-team all-state selection as a senior.  Thomas and his older brother, Bart, were high school teammates at White Deer High School in White Deer, Texas; in 1988, Thomas' freshman year, the White Deer team went 16–0 and won the Class 1A state championship.

College career
Thomas attended Texas Tech University, where he was a three-year starter at linebacker for the Texas Tech Red Raider football team.  As a junior in 1994, he was a first-team All-American.  As a senior in 1995, he was a unanimous first-team All-American, the Big 12 Conference Defensive Player of the Year, and a finalist for the Butkus Award. Thomas is one of 5 Red Raiders to be named a Unanimous All-American along with Mark Bounds, Byron Hanspard, Michael Crabtree, and Jace Amaro. He recorded 390 tackles, including a career-high 131 tackles and a school-record 20 tackles against  Georgia in his senior season. Thomas and his brother Bart were the only pair of brothers to be named first-team All-Southwest Conference selections in the same year.

Thomas was inducted into the College Football Hall of Fame in 2015.

College awards and honors
 Second-team Houston Chronicle All-SWC (1993)
 Second-team Houston Post All-SWC (1993)
 First-team UPI All-American (1994)
 Second-team Football News All-American (1994)
 Second-team Sporting News All-American (1994)
 2× SWC Defensive Player of the Year (1994, 1995)
 Unanimous first-team All-American (1995)
 First-team All-SWC (1995)
 College Football Hall of Fame
 Texas Tech Hall Of Fame

Professional career

Thomas attended the NFL Scouting Combine in Indianapolis, but had a performance that was described as lousy and included a 28.5" vertical jump. Miami Dolphins' special teams coordinator, Mike Westhoff, was sent to Texas by the Dolphins to meet with Thomas and scout him for their special teams unit. Thomas was considered to be too small and not fast or athletic enough to play at the professional level according to scouts and draft experts.

Miami Dolphins
The Miami Dolphins selected Thomas in the fifth round (154th overall) of the 1996 NFL Draft. Thomas was the 18th linebacker drafted in a linebacker class that included Ray Lewis, Tedy Bruschi, Donnie Edwards, and Kevin Hardy. Thomas was the second linebacker the Dolphins drafted in 1996, joining their fourth round pick Baylor linebacker LaCurtis Jones (126th overall). Thomas was initially drafted to join special teams after the Miami Dolphins' special teams coordinator Mike Westhoff recommended him to head coach Jimmy Johnson.

1996
On July 3, 1996, the Miami Dolphins signed Thomas to a three-year, $577,000 contract at the league minimum. He impressed the Dolphins' coaching staff during training camp and quickly rose up the depth chart to compete for the job as the starting middle linebacker against Jack Del Rio. Head coach Jimmy Johnson officially named Thomas the starting middle linebacker to begin the regular season. On August 3, 1996, the Miami Dolphins subsequently released Del Rio due to the sudden emergence of Thomas.

He made his professional regular season debut and first career start in the Miami Dolphins' season-opener at home, against the New England Patriots and made nine combined tackles and his first career sack in their 24–10 victory. Thomas made his first career tackle on Patriots' running back Curtis Martin and made his first career sack on Patriots' quarterback Drew Bledsoe for a six-yard loss in the first quarter. The following week, he collected a season-high 15 combined tackles as the Dolphins defeated the Arizona Cardinals 38–10. In Week 6, he collected 12 combined tackles in the Dolphins' 22–15 loss against the Seattle Seahawks. On October 13, 1996, Thomas recorded 11 combined tackles, a sack, and made his first career interception during a 21–7 win at the Buffalo Bills in Week 7. Thomas made his first career interception off a pass by Bills' quarterback Jim Kelly, that was originally intended for tight end Lonnie Johnson, and returned it for an 11-yard gain in the first quarter. On November 17, 1996, Thomas made eight combined tackles and returned an interception for his first career touchdown in the Dolphins' 23–20 win against the Houston Oilers in Week 12. Thomas intercepted a pass by Oilers' quarterback Chris Chandler, that was intended for tight end Frank Wycheck, and returned it for a 26-yard touchdown in the fourth quarter. Thomas finished his rookie season in 1996 with 153 combined tackles, three interceptions, and two sacks, while starting all 16 games. Thomas was a 1997 Pro Bowl alternate and an All-Rookie selection in 1996.

1997
On August 4, 1997, Thomas sustained a fractured fibula during the Dolphins' 38–19 win against the Denver Broncos in their preseason-opener. His injury sidelined him for the remainder of the preseason and he was also inactive for the Miami Dolphins' 16–10 season-opening victory against the Indianapolis Colts. Head coach Jimmy Johnson named Thomas the starting middle linebacker upon his return from injury. He started alongside outside linebackers Anthony Harris and Derrick Rodgers. In Week 4, he collected a season-high 12 combined tackles and made an interception during a 31–21 loss at the Tampa Bay Buccaneers. On October 27, 1997, Thomas tied his season-high of 12 combined tackles in the Dolphins' 36–33 loss at the Chicago Bears in Week 9. He finished the 1997 season with a total of 127 combined tackles, an interception, and was credited with half a sack in 15 games and 15 starts.

The Miami Dolphins finished second in the AFC East with a 9–7 record and earned a wildcard berth. On December 28, 1997, Thomas started in his first career playoff game and recorded ten combined tackles during the Dolphins 17–3 loss as the New England Patriots won the AFC Wildcard Game.

1998
Thomas was retained as the starting middle linebacker for the third consecutive season and started alongside outside linebackers Robert Jones and Derrick Rodgers.

On September 20, 1998, Thomas recorded eight combined tackles and returned an interception for a touchdown during a 21–0 win against the Pittsburgh Steelers in Week 3. Thomas intercepted a pass by Steelers' quarterback Kordell Stewart and returned it for a 17-yard touchdown in the third quarter. On November 1, 1998, he collected a season-high 14 combined tackles during a 30–24 loss at the Buffalo Bills in Week 9. In Week 14, Thomas recorded six combined tackles and made a season-high two interceptions in the Dolphins' 27–17 win at the Oakland Raiders. Thomas intercepted two pass attempts by quarterback Donald Hollas. He started in all 16 games in 1998 and recorded 133 combined tackles, three interceptions, and two sacks. Thomas was first-team All-Pro for the first time in his career as the Dolphins defense allowed the fewest points in the NFL.

The Miami Dolphins finished second in the AFC East with a 10–6 record and earned a playoff berth. On January 2, 1999, Thomas recorded eight combined tackles during a 24–17 win against the Buffalo Bills in the AFC Wildcard Game. The following week, he made ten combined tackles as the Dolphins' lost to the Denver Broncos in the AFC Divisional Round 38–3.

1999
On February 13, 1999, the Miami Dolphins signed Thomas to a five-year, $22.50 million contract that included a signing bonus of $4.50 million. Thomas's $6.5 million in salary and bonus made him the Dolphins highest paid player, surpassing Dan Marino. Head coach Jimmy Johnson retained Thomas, Robert Jones, and Derrick Rodgers as the starting linebackers in 1999. In Week 15, Thomas collected a season-high 13 combined tackles during the Dolphins' 12–9 win against the San Diego Chargers. He started in all 16 games in 1999 and recorded 132 combined tackles, a sack, and an interception. Thomas was selected to the 2000 Pro Bowl, marking the first Pro Bowl selection of his career.

The Miami Dolphins finished third in the AFC East with a 9–7 record and earned a playoff berth. On January 9, 2000, Thomas recorded nine combined tackles and a sack during a 20–17 victory at the Seattle Seahawks in the AFC Wildcard Game. The following week, he made ten combined tackles as the Dolphins lost 62–7 at the Jacksonville Jaguars in the AFC Divisional Round.

2000
On January 17, 2000, head coach Jimmy Johnson announced his decision to step down as head coach of the Miami Dolphins. Assistant head coach Dave Wannstedt was promoted to head coach. Wannstedt opted to retain Thomas as the starting middle linebacker, alongside Robert Jones and Derrick Rodgers. On September 17, 2000, Thomas collected a season-high 13 combined tackles during a 19–6 win against the Baltimore Ravens in Week 3. Thomas was sidelined during the Dolphins' Week 5 victory at the Cincinnati Bengals due to a sprained ankle. Thomas was inactive for four games (Weeks 9–12) after aggravating his sprained ankle during a Week 8 loss at the New York Jets the previous week. He finished the 2000 season with 99 combined tackles, 1.5 sacks, and an interception in 11 games and 11 starts.

2001
Defensive coordinator Jim Bates retained Thomas as the starting middle linebacker. He started alongside Twan Russell and Derrick Rodgers to begin the 2001 regular season.

He started in the Miami Dolphins' season-opener at the Tennessee Titans and recorded nine combined tackles, deflected two passes, and returned an interception for a touchdown in their 31–23 victory. Thomas intercepted a pass by Titans backup quarterback Neil O'Donnell, that was intended for tight end Erron Kinney, and returned it for a 34-yard touchdown in the fourth quarter. The following week, he collected a career-high 18 combined tackles (nine solo) during an 18–15 victory against the Oakland Raiders in Week 2. In Week 5, he recorded nine combined tackles and made a season-high 1.5 sacks as the Dolphins lost 21–17 at the New York Jets. Thomas finished the 2001 season with 154 combined tackles (94 solo), three sacks, two pass deflections, two interceptions, and a touchdown in 15 games and 15 starts. Head coach Dave Wannstedt chose to rest Thomas during the Dolphins' Week 17 win against the Buffalo Bills as they had already clinched a playoff berth. Thomas was also selected to play in the 2002 Pro Bowl.

The Miami Dolphins finished second in the AFC East in 2001 with an 11–5 record. On January 13, 2002, Thomas recorded 22 combined tackles (14 solo) during the Dolphins' 20–3 loss against the Baltimore Ravens in the AFC Wildcard Game.

2002
Thomas returned as the starting middle linebacker under head coach Dave Wannstedt and started alongside outside linebackers Derrick Rodgers and Morlon Greenwood. On December 29, 2002, Thomas collected a season-high 16 combined tackles (11 solo) in the Dolphins' 27-24 loss at the New England Patriots in Week 17. He started in all 16 games in 2002 and recorded 156 combined tackles (101 solo), two pass deflections, an interception, and was credited with half a sack.

2003
On March 27, 2003, the Miami Dolphins signed Thomas to a five-year, $33.75 million contract extension that included a signing bonus of $10.50 million. The agreement kept him under contract with Miami through 2008.

On November 2, 2003, Thomas collected a season-high 19 combined tackles (12 solo) in the Dolphins' 23–17 loss to the Indianapolis Colts in Week 9. He was inactive for the Dolphins' Week 10 loss at the Tennessee Titans due to a groin injury. On November 27, 2003, Thomas made six combined tackles, a pass deflection, a sack, and an interception during a 40–21 victory at the Dallas Cowboys in Week 13. Thomas intercepted a pass by Cowboys' quarterback Quincy Carter, that was intended for wide receiver Terry Glenn, in the fourth quarter. He finished the 2002 season with 152 combined tackles  
(84 solo), six pass deflections, three interceptions, and a sack in 15 games and 15 starts. Thomas was selected to play in the 2004 Pro Bowl and earned his fifth All-Pro selection in six years.

2004
Thomas started alongside Morlon Greenwood and Junior Seau in 2004 after the Dolphins signed Seau during free agency. On November 9, 2004, head coach Dave Wannstedt unexpectedly announced his resignation as the Miami Dolphins' head coach after they declined and fell to a 1-8 record. Defensive coordinator Jim Bates was promoted to interim head coach for the last seven games of the regular season. Thomas injured his hamstring and was sidelined for three games (Weeks 13–15). On December 26, 2004, Thomas collected a season-high 18 combined tackles (nine solo) during the Dolphins' 10–7 victory against the Cleveland Browns in Week 16. He finished the 2004 NFL season with 145 combined tackles (85 solo), four pass deflections, and two sacks in 13 games and 13 starts. The Miami Dolphins finished with a disappointing record of 4–12 and the remaining coaching staff was fired after the season.

2005
Head coach Nick Saban retained Thomas as the starting middle linebacker in 2005. Thomas started 
the 2005 season alongside outside linebackers Channing Crowder and Junior Seau. He also played under defensive coordinator Richard Smith and linebackers coach George Edwards.

In Week 3, he collected a season-high 16 combined tackles (nine solo), broke up a pass, and made a sack during a 27–24 win against the Carolina Panthers. On October 21, 2005, Thomas made 14 combined tackles (eight solo) as the Dolphins lost 30–20 to the Kansas City Chiefs in Week 7. His 14 combined tackles against the Chiefs continued his streak of six consecutive games with double-digit tackles. In Week 11, Thomas injured his shoulder and was inactive for the next two games (Weeks 12–13). On December 11, 2005, Thomas recorded 11 combined tackles (nine solo), broke up a pass, and intercepted a pass attempt by Chargers' quarterback Drew Brees as the Dolphins defeated the San Diego Chargers 23–21 in Week 15. On December 19, 2005, it was announced that Thomas was selected to play in the 2006 Pro Bowl, marking his seventh Pro Bowl selection of his career. He tied for the third most Pro Bowl appearances in club history; this is also the record for most Pro Bowl selections among all defensive players in the Dolphins'  
franchise history. Thomas finished his tenth season in 2005 with 158 combined tackles (104 solo), three pass deflections, two sacks, and two interceptions in 14 games and 14 starts.

2006
On January 23, 2006, the Miami Dolphins hired former Houston Texans' head coach Dom Capers as their new defensive coordinator. Capers opted to retain Thomas as the starting middle linebacker and named Channing Crowder and Donnie Spragan the starting outside linebackers.

In Week 11, he collected 17 combined tackles (four solo) in a 24–20 victory against the Minnesota Vikings. The following week, he recorded six solo tackles, broke up a pass, and made two sacks on Lions'quarterback Jon Kitna during a 27–10 victory at the Detroit Lions in Week 12. On December 17, 2006, Thomas recorded a career-high 21 combined tackles during a 21–0 loss at the Buffalo Bills in Week 15. On December 20, 2006, Thomas was selected to play in the 2007 Pro Bowl as part of the AFC Roster. Thomas started all 16 games in 2006 and recorded a career-high 165 combined tackles (103 solo), nine passes defensed, three sacks, and an interception.

2007
On January 3, 2007, Miami Dolphins' head coach Nick Saban resigned from his position to accept the head coaching job with the University of Alabama. Saban resigned after repeatedly denying he would accept the position. The Dolphins hired the San Diego Chargers' offensive coordinator Cam Cameron. Cameron retained Dom Capers as the defensive coordinator and George Edwards as the linebackers coach. Thomas remained the starting middle linebacker, alongside outside linebackers Channing Crowder and Joey Porter.

He started in the Miami Dolphins' season-opener at the Washington Redskins and collected  a season-high 13 combined tackles (nine solo) and made one sack in their 16–13 loss.
On September 16, 2007, Thomas recorded ten combined tackles and broke up two passes before exiting the game due to a concussion he suffered while tackling Cowboys' fullback Oliver Hoyte in the third quarter of their 37–10 loss to the Dallas Cowboys. 
His concussion rendered him inactive for the next two games (Weeks 3–4). On October 21, 2007, Thomas was involved in a car collision and sustained another concussion during the accident. His repeated concussions caused Thomas to have migraine headaches that lingered until being placed on the injured reserve list. On December 4, 2007, the Miami Dolphins officially placed Thomas on injured reserve after he missed five games (Weeks 8–13) due to his 
repeated migraine headaches. On December 20, 2007, the Miami Dolphins hired Bill Parcells as their head of football operations. Thomas finished the 2007 season with 52 combined tackles (42 solo), two pass deflections, and a sack in five games and five starts.

2008
On January 1, 2008, the Miami Dolphins fired head coach Cam Cameron after a 1-15 record. On February 14, 2008, the Miami Dolphins released Thomas after announcing that he no longer fit into their long term plans and his contract was terminated. Thomas received offers from the Dallas Cowboys, New Orleans Saints and New England Patriots.

Dallas Cowboys
On February 23, 2008, the Dallas Cowboys signed Thomas to a one-year, $3 million contract that included a signing bonus of $1 million. The signing of Thomas surprised media and observers, considering that he didn't have the previous experience or the size to play in the Cowboys 3-4 defense. After he joined the roster, the Cowboys traded linebacker Akin Ayodele to the Miami Dolphins to clear space for Thomas to become a starter at inside linebacker. Thomas started alongside Bradie James and outside linebackers DeMarcus Ware and Greg Ellis. In Week 4, he collected a season-high 12 combined tackles (six solo) during the Cowboys' 26–24 loss to the Washington Redskins. He finished the season with 94 combined tackles (65 solo), three pass deflections, and a sack in 16 games and 14 starts.

Kansas City Chiefs
An unrestricted free agent in the 2009 offseason, Thomas agreed to terms with the Kansas City Chiefs on April 11. The one-year contract was worth $2 million.

He suffered a concussion early in training camp and was eventually released on September 5, after not playing in any exhibition games. In October, he filed a grievance against the Chiefs for releasing him without an injury settlement while recovering.

Retirement

On May 18, 2010, the Miami Dolphins signed Thomas to a one-day ceremonial contract, officially worth $1, in order to retire as a member of the Miami Dolphins. He also owns the Zach's Club 54 in Amarillo and Lubbock.

Awards and honors

In addition to being a seven-time All-Pro selection by the Associated Press and a seven-time Pro Bowl selection, Thomas earned the following awards and honors in his NFL career:
 NFL Defensive Rookie of the Month (October 1996)
 All-Rookie selection by College & Pro Football Newsweekly, The Football News, Pro Football Weekly and Pro Football Writers of America (1996)
 AFC Defensive Rookie of the Year (1996)
 Dolphins' 1996 Unsung Hero Award as selected by NFLPA
 Dolphins MVP and Newcomer of the Year by South Florida media (1996)
 AFC Defensive Player of the Month (September 1998)
 2× NFL Alumni Association's Linebacker of the Year (1998, 2006)
 First-team All-Pro selection by the USA Today, College & Pro Football Newsweekly and Football Digest (1998)
 1998 All-Madden Team (1998)
 3× Dolphins' Leadership Award (1998, 1999, 2005)
 Weeks 1 & 16 2001 AFC Defensive Player of the Week (2001)
 Dolphins MVP by South Florida media and fans (2001)
 All-Iron Team as selected by CBS analyst Phil Simms (2001)
 PFWA Dolphins Chapter "Good Guy" Award (2001)
 First-team Pro Football Weekly All-AFC (2002)
 First-team Sports Illustrated All-Pro (2003)
 Second-team Football Digest All-Pro (2003)
 Week 14 AFC Defensive Player of the Week (2005)
 All-AFC selection by Pro Football Weekly and the Pro Football Writers of America (2006)
 Only two linebackers currently in the Hall of Fame have more combined tackles. Ray Lewis (2,061) and Junior Seau (1,846).

In 2006, Zach Thomas was inducted into the Texas Tech Hall of Fame. In 2015, Thomas was inducted into the College Football Hall of Fame and the following year in 2016, was inducted into the Texas Tech Red Raiders Ring of Honor.

In 2012, Thomas was inducted into the Miami Dolphins Honor Roll along side his teammate Jason Taylor. Thomas became eligible for the Pro Football Hall of Fame beginning in 2014, and would become a semi-finalist for the first time in 2019. He would then reach being a finalist for election the next three years from 2020-2022. After being a finalist for a 4th consecutive year in his 10th overall year of eligibility, on February 9, 2023, Zach Thomas was elected to the Pro Football Hall of Fame.

NFL career statistics

Regular season

Personal life
Thomas was raised in Pampa, Texas by his parents, Steve and Bobby Thomas. He has an older brother, Bart Thomas, and younger sister, Katina Thomas. Katina was married to Thomas' Dolphins' teammate, Jason Taylor, from 2000 to 2015 and has three children with him. Katina filed for divorce on January 25, 2015, and it was officially finalized on February 10, 2015.
Thomas' father, Steve Thomas, is the builder and proprietor of the second largest cross in the Western Hemisphere, located in Groom, Texas. Thomas is married to Maritza Thomas.

For the first three-years of his career Thomas earned the league minimum and lived with teammate Larry Izzo.

References

External links
Top 50 Dolphins: Zach Thomas

1973 births
Living people
All-American college football players
American Conference Pro Bowl players
American football middle linebackers
Dallas Cowboys players
Kansas City Chiefs players
Miami Dolphins players
People from Pampa, Texas
Players of American football from Texas
Texas Tech Red Raiders football players
College Football Hall of Fame inductees
Ed Block Courage Award recipients